The foreign policy of Xi Jinping concerns the policies of the People's Republic of China's Xi Jinping with respect to other nations. Xi succeeded as the General Secretary of the Chinese Communist Party and became the paramount leader in 2012. Xi has reportedly taken a hard-line on security issues as well as foreign affairs, projecting a more nationalistic and assertive China on the world stage. His political program calls for a China more united and confident of its own value system and political structure. Xi Jinping's "Major Country Diplomacy" doctrine has replaced the earlier Deng Xiaoping era slogan of "keep a low profile" and has legitimized a more active role for China on the world stage, particularly with regards to reform of the international order, engaging in open ideological competition with the West, and assuming a greater responsibility for global affairs in accordance with China's rising power and status.

Xi Jinping's foreign policy writ large, perceived anti-China hostility from the West amongst Chinese government officials, and shifts within the Chinese diplomatic bureaucracy have been cited as factors leading to its emergence. It is commonly known as "Wolf warrior diplomacy".

Overview 
Xi takes a strong personal interest in foreign affairs. In his first five years in office, Xi flew over 350,000 miles, visited five continents, and gave over one hundred speeches to foreign audiences. In doing so, he became the first Chinese leader to outpace his American presidential counterparts in foreign travel. Xi's extensive schedule of phone and video foreign meetings as part of his "cloud diplomacy" (云外交) received prominent attention in Chinese media, similar to in-person foreign visits.

Xi has overseen a shift towards a Chinese foreign policy which, as contrasted with the approaches of Chinese leaders since Deng Xiaoping, is more assertive in acting proactively rather than reacting, and more willing to forcefully assert national interests rather than compromise them. Xi states that the "primary theme of China's foreign policy should be the striving for achievements, moving forward along with time changes, and acting more proactively." Xi calls on diplomats to demonstrate a fighting spirit, which has been expressed in the form of wolf warrior diplomacy.

Xi advocates "baseline thinking" in China's foreign policy: setting explicit red lines that other countries must not cross. In the Chinese perspective, these tough stances on baseline issues reduce strategic uncertainty, preventing other nations from misjudging China's positions or underestimating China's resolve in asserting what it perceives to be in its national interest.

Before 2017, Xi stated that China should participate in forming a new global order. This position changed in 2017, when Xi articulated the "Two Guidances": (1) China should guide the global community in building a more just and reasonable world order, and (2) that China should guide the global community in safeguarding international security. 

During the COVID-19 pandemic, China engaged in mask diplomacy, a practice facilitated by its early success in responding to the pandemic. Chinese ownership of much of the global medical supply chain enhanced its ability to send doctors and medical equipment to suffering countries. China soon followed its mask diplomacy with vaccine diplomacy. China's infection rates were sufficiently low that it could send vaccines abroad without domestic objections. Academic Suisheng Zhao writes that "[j]ust by showing up and helping plug the colossal gaps in the global supply, China gained ground."

Taiwan (Republic of China) 

Xi states that "reunification" with Taiwan should occur peacefully because that is "most in line with the overall interest of the Chinese nation, including Taiwan compatriots." In a speech at the Communist Party of China Centenary, Xi stated:

Xi has also said that unification under a "one country, two systems" approach would be appropriate. 

In 2021, American think tank Council on Foreign Relations described Xi's position on Taiwan as continuing consistent with China's 1979 shift from "liberation" of Taiwan to "peaceful unification" with Taiwan.

Americas

United States 

Xi has called China–United States relations in the contemporary world a "new type of great-power relations", a phrase the Obama administration had been reluctant to embrace. Under his administration the Strategic and Economic Dialogue that began under Hu Jintao has continued. On China–U.S. relations, Xi said, "If [China and the United States] are in confrontation, it would surely spell disaster for both countries".  The U.S. has been critical of Chinese actions in the South China Sea. In 2014, Chinese hackers compromised the computer system of the U.S. Office of Personnel Management, resulting in the theft of approximately 22 million personnel records handled by the office.

Xi has also indirectly spoken out critically on the U.S. "strategic pivot" to Asia. Addressing a regional conference in Shanghai on 21 May 2014, he called on Asian countries to unite and forge a way together, rather than get involved with third party powers, seen as a reference to the United States. "Matters in Asia ultimately must be taken care of by Asians. Asia's problems ultimately must be resolved by Asians and Asia's security ultimately must be protected by Asians", he told the conference.

In spite of what seemed to be a tumultuous start to Xi Jinping's leadership vis-à-vis the United States, on 13 May 2017 Xi said at the Belt and Road Forum in Beijing: "We should foster a new type of international relations featuring 'win-win cooperation', and we should forge a partnership of dialogue with no confrontation, and a partnership of friendship rather than alliance. All countries should respect each other's sovereignty, dignity and territorial integrity; respect each other's development path and its social systems, and respect each other's core interests and major concerns... What we hope to create is a big family of harmonious coexistence."

Asia

Iran 

On 4 June 2019, Xi told the Russian news agency TASS that he was "worried" about the current tensions between the U.S. and Iran. He later told his Iranian counterpart Hassan Rouhani during an SCO meeting that China would promote ties with Iran regardless of developments from the Gulf of Oman incident.

Japan 
China–Japan relations have soured under Xi's administration; the most thorny issue between the two countries remains the dispute over the Senkaku islands, which China calls Diaoyu. In response to Japan's continued robust stance on the issue, China declared an Air Defense Identification Zone in November 2013.

Korea 
Under Xi, China has also taken a more critical stance on North Korea, while improving relationships with South Korea.

Starting in 2017, China's relationship with South Korea soured over the THAAD purchase of the latter while China's relations with North Korea increased because of meetings between Xi and North Korean leader Kim Jong-un. At the G20 meeting in Japan, Xi called for a "timely easing" of sanctions imposed on North Korea.

Europe

Russia 
Xi has cultivated stronger relations with Russia, particularly in the wake of the Ukraine crisis of 2014. He seems to have developed a strong personal relationship with President Vladimir Putin. Both are viewed as strong leaders with a nationalist orientation who are not afraid to assert themselves against Western interests. Xi attended the opening ceremonies of the 2014 Winter Olympics in Sochi. Under Xi, China signed a $400 billion gas deal with Russia; China has also become Russia's largest trading partner.

Public opinion 
In the 2019, the Pew Research Center made a survey on attitudes to Xi Jinping among six-country medians based on Australia, India, Indonesia, Japan, Philippines and South Korea. The survey indicated that a median 29% have confidence in Xi Jinping to do the right thing regarding world affairs, meanwhile a median of 45% have no confidence. These number are similar to those of North Korean leader Kim Jong Un (23% confidence, 53% no confidence).

See also
 Xi Jinping Thought on Diplomacy

References

Further reading 
 Avery Goldstein. 2020. "China's Grand Strategy under Xi Jinping: Reassurance, Reform, and Resistance." International Security.

Foreign relations of China
Xi Jinping
History of the People's Republic of China
Xi, Jinping